Dennis Sandole (29 September 1913 — 30 September 2000) born Dionigi Sandoli, was an American jazz guitarist, composer, and music educator from Philadelphia.

Biography
Sandole was John Coltrane's mentor from 1946 until the early 1950s, introducing him to music theory beyond chords and scales and exposing him to the music of other cultures. Sandole taught advanced harmonic techniques that were applicable to any instrument, using exotic scales and creating his own. 

He taught privately until the end of his life. His students included saxophonists James Moody, Benny Golson, Michael Brecker, Rob Brown and Bobby Zankel; trumpeter Art Farmer;  pianists Matthew Shipp and Sumi Tonooka; guitarists Jim Hall, Joe Diorio, Pat Martino, Joe Federico, Tony DeCaprio, Jon Herington, Bob DeVos, Larry Hoffman and Harry Leahey and other musicians such as Rufus Harley and Frank Gerrard.

Sandole recorded Modern Music from Philadelphia, with his brother, Adolf Sandole (1922–1959), which was released by Fantasy Records in 1956 and credited to The Sandole Brothers.

Death and interment
Sandole died on September 30, 2000, in Philadelphia, Pennsylvania and was interred at West Laurel Hill Cemetery.

References

1913 births
2000 deaths
American people of Italian descent
American jazz guitarists
20th-century American guitarists
American male guitarists
20th-century American male musicians
Burials at West Laurel Hill Cemetery
American male jazz musicians